Užava  (also Dižupe, Zirgmežupe; upstream known as Mazkaiba river, Mālupe; middle stream name Bumbuļupe)  is river in Latvia in  Kuldīgas,  Alsungas and  Ventspils counties.  It empties into the Baltic Sea.

Geography
It flows along the Piemare and Ventava plains in a north-eastern direction.
Most of the flow, except for the section between Tērande and Sise, is regulated and river bed is straightened. As a result of land development and drainage, polder was built along the river. River discharges into the Baltic sea below the village of Užava.

Tributaries 
Left bank tributaries
 Saltvalks,
 Bērzkalnupe,
 Tiemene.
Right bank tributaries
 Guļas valks (7 km),
  Stirna (10 km),
 Mārgava (6 km),
 Kauliņas River (26 km),
 Vanka (30 km),
 Gaiļvalks,
  Tērande (15 km).

See also 
Užava lowland

References 

Rivers of Latvia
Drainage basins of the Baltic Sea